Greg Warren may refer to:

 Greg Warren (American football) (born 1981), NFL player
 Greg Warren (politician), Australian politician